Paul Artin Boghossian (born 1957) is an American philosopher. He is Silver Professor of Philosophy at New York University, where he is chair of the department (having also held the position from 1994 to 2004). His research interests include epistemology, the philosophy of mind, and the philosophy of language. He is also director of the New York Institute of Philosophy and Distinguished Research Professor of Philosophy at the University of Birmingham.

Education and career
Boghossian is of Armenian ancestry.

Boghossian earned his B.S. in physics at Trent University in 1976, and his Ph.D. in philosophy at Princeton University in 1987. In addition to his position at NYU, he was a professor of philosophy at the University of Michigan at Ann Arbor from 1984 until 1992, and has also been a visiting professor at Princeton University. He has held research fellowships from the National Endowment for the Humanities, Magdalen College, Oxford, the University of London, and the Australian National University, and is a fellow of the New York Institute for the Humanities. He is on the editorial board of the journals Philosophical Studies and Philosophers' Imprint. As chair of the NYU philosophy department from 1994 to 2004, Boghossian built the NYU program into one of the top philosophy programs in the world.
In postmodern circles, Boghossian is known for his response to the Sokal hoax.

Boghossian also serves as a member of the Scientific Advisory Board for the World Knowledge Dialogue Foundation.

His book Fear of Knowledge won a Choice Award as an outstanding Academic Book of 2006.

In 2012, he was elected a Fellow of the American Academy of Arts and Sciences.

Philosophical work

In his early work, Boghossian criticized naturalistic theories of content.

Much of his later work, including his book Fear of Knowledge, criticizes various forms of relativism, especially epistemic relativism, which claims that knowledge and reason are fundamentally cultural or subjective rather than objective.

In his article "Blind Reasoning", Boghossian argues that we are blind to our reasons for justifying our methods of inference (the epitome of a method of inference is taken to be modus ponens). Rejecting both Simple Inferential Externalism for its inconsistency and Simple Inferential Internalism because it is difficult to accept, he opts for a third and new form of "rational insight". This paper, in conjunction with an ongoing correspondence between Boghossian and Crispin Wright, is part of a project to defend against epistemic relativism.

Selected publications

Books
Content and Justification: Philosophical Papers, Oxford University Press, 2008. 
Fear of Knowledge: Against Relativism and Constructivism, Oxford University Press, 2006.

Articles
"How Are Objective Epistemic Reasons Possible?" in Philosophical Studies, Dec 2001, pp. 340–380.
"Inference and Insight," in Philosophy and Phenomenological Research, November, 2001, pp. 633–641.
"On Hearing the Music in the Sound," in The Journal of Aesthetics and Art Criticism (2002).
"The Gospel of Relaxation" (review of The Metaphysical Club by Louis Menand), The New Republic, September 2001.
"What is Social Construction?" in Times Literary Supplement, February 23, 2001, pp. 6–8.
New Essays on the A Priori (co-edited with Christopher Peacocke), Oxford University Press 2000.
"Knowledge of Logic," in New Essays on the A Priori, Oxford University Press 2000.
"Analyticity," in Bob Hale  and Crispin Wright (eds.): The Philosophy of Language (Oxford: Basil Blackwell, 1997), pp. 331–368.

Media 

 'The Secrets of the World': Debate with philosophers Rebecca Roache and Hilary Lawson, and author Rupert Sheldrake. 
 'The Word and the World': Debate with philosopher Ray Monk and novelist Joanna Kavenna.
 'Strange New Worlds': Debate with literary critic Terry Eagleton and Chocolat author Joanne Harris.

See also
 Analytic–synthetic distinction

Notes and references

20th-century American male writers
20th-century American philosophers
20th-century births
20th-century educational theorists
20th-century essayists
20th-century social scientists
21st-century American male writers
21st-century American philosophers
21st-century educational theorists
21st-century essayists
21st-century social scientists
Academics of the University of Birmingham
Academics of the University of London
Action theorists
American ethicists
American logicians
American male essayists
American male non-fiction writers
American writers of Armenian descent
Analytic philosophers
Academic staff of the Australian National University
Critics of postmodernism
Epistemologists
Fellows of Magdalen College, Oxford
Fellows of the American Academy of Arts and Sciences
Literacy and society theorists
Living people
Metaphysicians
Metaphysics writers
New York University faculty
Ontologists
Philosophers of art
Philosophers of culture
Philosophers of education
Philosophers of language
Philosophers of logic
Philosophers of mind
Philosophers of science
Philosophers of social science
Philosophy academics
Princeton University alumni
Princeton University faculty
Rationalists
Stanford University alumni
Trent University alumni
University of Michigan faculty
Year of birth missing (living people)